Catherine McEvoy is an Irish musician who plays the Irish traditional flute. She received the TG4 Musician of the Year award in 2019. Her playing is influenced by Josie McDermott.

References 

Living people
Irish flautists
Year of birth missing (living people)